Marjorie Glicksman Grene (December 13, 1910 – March 16, 2009) was an American philosopher. She wrote on existentialism and the philosophy of science, especially the philosophy of biology. She taught at the University of California at Davis from 1965 to 1978. From 1988 until her death, she was Honorary University Distinguished Professor of Philosophy at Virginia Tech.

Life and career
Grene obtained her first degree, in zoology, from Wellesley College in 1931. She then obtained (from 1933–1935) an M.A. and then a doctorate in philosophy from Radcliffe College. This was, she said, "as close as females in those days got to Harvard".

Grene studied with Martin Heidegger and Karl Jaspers, leaving Germany in 1933. She was in Denmark in 1935, and then at the University of Chicago. After losing her position there during World War II, she spent 15 years as a mother and farmer. She was elected a Fellow of the American Academy of Arts and Sciences in 1976.

Her New York Times obituary said Grene was "one of the first philosophers to raise questions about the synthetic theory of evolution, which combines Darwin's theory of evolution, Mendel's understanding of genetic inheritance and more recent discoveries by molecular biologists". Along with David Depew, she wrote the first history of the philosophy of biology. In 2002, she was the first female philosopher to have a volume of the Library of Living Philosophers devoted to her.

In 1995, the International Society for the History, Philosophy, and Social Studies of Biology established a prize for young scholars in Grene's name, writing: "Not only does her work in the history and philosophy of biology exemplify the strong spirit of interdisciplinary work fundamental to the ISHPSSB, but she played a central role in bringing together diverse scholars of biology even before the formation of the Society."

Family
From 1938 to 1961, Grene was married to David Grene, a classicist who farmed in Illinois and in his native Ireland. They had two children, Ruth Grene, a professor of plant physiology at Virginia Tech, and Nicholas Grene, a professor of English literature at Trinity College, Dublin.

Works
Books authored
Dreadful Freedom: A Critique of Existentialism (1948) Reissued as Introduction to Existentialism (1959)
Martin Heidegger (1957)
A Portrait of Aristotle (1963)
The Knower and the Known (1966)
Approaches to a Philosophical Biology (1968)
Sartre (1973)
The Understanding of Nature: Essays In The Philosophy Of Biology  (1974)
Philosophy In and Out of Europe (1976) essays
Descartes (1985)
Descartes Among the Scholastics (1991) Aquinas Lecture 1991
Interactions. The Biological Context of Social Systems (1992) with Niles Eldredge
A Philosophical Testament (1995)
Philosophy of Biology: An Episodic History (2004) with David Depew
Works edited and translated

Philosophers Speak for Themselves: From Descartes To Kant. Readings in the Philosophy of the Renaissance and Enlightenment (1940) with Thomas Vernor Smith
Reissued in two volumes: Descartes to Locke (1958) and Berkeley, Hume, Kant (1963)
The World View of Physics by C. F. von Weizsäcker (1952) translator
The Anatomy of Knowledge: Papers Presented to the Study Group on Foundations of Cultural Unity, Bowdoin College, 1965 and 1966;  (1969) editor
Knowing & Being: essays by Michael Polanyi, (1969) editor
Toward a Unity of Knowledge (1969) editor
Laughing and Crying: A Study of the Limits of Human Behavior by Helmuth Plessner (1970)  translator with James Spencer Churchill
Interpretations of Life and Mind: Essays Around the Problem of Reduction (1971) editor
Spinoza : A Collection of Critical Essays (1973) editor
Topics in the Philosophy of Biology (1976) editor with Everett Mendelsohn
Dimensions Of Darwinism : Themes And Counterthemes In Twentieth-Century Evolutionary Theory (1983) editor
Spinoza And The Sciences (1986) editor
Muntu : African Culture and the Western World by Janheinz Jahn (1990) translator
Descartes and His Contemporaries: Meditations, Objections, and Replies  (1995) editor with Roger Ariew
The Mechanization of the Heart: Harvey and Descartes by Thomas Fuchs (2001) translator
Malebranche's First and Last Critics: Simon Foucher and Dortous De Mairan (2002) with Richard A. Watson; translator
Apology for Raymond Sebond by Montaigne (2003) translator with Roger Ariew
Geoffroy Saint Hilaire by Hervé Le Guyader (2004) translator

*For more complete details see "The Publications of Marjorie Grene" in her 1986 festschrift Human Nature and Natural Knowledge or Grene's C.V.

See also
American philosophy
List of American philosophers

References

Further reading
The Philosophy of Marjorie Grene (2002), edited by Randall E. Auxier and Lewis Edwin Hahn

External links

The philosophy of Marjorie Grene 2003 profile by Sally Harris for Virginia Tech Magazine (Archived by Wayback Machine)
An Interview with Marjorie Grene 2005 article by Benjamin Cohen for The Believer magazine. (Archived by Wayback Machine)
IN MEMORIAM - Marjorie Glicksman Grene from the University Of California.
In Memoriam: Marjorie Grene from Virginia Tech Daily (Archived by Wayback Machine)
In Memoriam Marjorie Glicksman Grene (1910-2009) eulogy by Richard Burian and Roger Ariew for Isis. (Archived by Wayback Machine)

Jewish American writers
Jewish philosophers
Writers from Virginia
Virginia Tech faculty
University of Chicago faculty
Wellesley College alumni
Radcliffe College alumni
Presidents of the Metaphysical Society of America
1910 births
2009 deaths
Writers from Chicago
Fellows of the American Academy of Arts and Sciences
American women philosophers
Existentialists
Philosophers of science
20th-century American philosophers
20th-century American women writers
American women non-fiction writers
20th-century American Jews
21st-century American Jews
21st-century American women
Philosophers of biology
Distinguished professors of philosophy